Stefania Alexandrovna Elfutina (born 27 January 1997) is a Russian competitive sailor. Her first medal in a senior event was winning bronze at the 2016 European Sailing Championships in Helsinki.

Elfutina won a bronze medal at the 2016 Summer Olympics in Rio de Janeiro, in the women's RS:X.

References

External links
 
 
 

1997 births
Living people
Russian female sailors (sport)
Olympic sailors of Russia
Sailors at the 2016 Summer Olympics – RS:X
Olympic bronze medalists for Russia
Olympic medalists in sailing
Medalists at the 2016 Summer Olympics
People from Yeysk
Sportspeople from Krasnodar Krai
Russian windsurfers
Female windsurfers